Almeric George Hall (12 November 1912 - 7 November 1994) was an English footballer and manager.

Born in Hove, Hall, a striker, began his professional career in 1930 with his local club Brighton & Hove Albion.  Before making any appearances for the Sussex club he moved to Tottenham Hotspur. He scored twice on his Spurs debut, in a 2-1 victory over Grimsby Town at White Hart Lane on Boxing Day 1934 in the First Division. He later played for Southend United, Bradford City, where his one appearance was later expunged from the records after the outbreak of the Second World War. 

After the war he played for West Ham United where he made 50 Football League appearances, having previously appeared as a guest player for West Ham during the war, before moving to non-league Margate in 1950 as player-manager.

He played for the Kent club until 1953, when he retired from playing to concentrate on management and remained the club's manager until 1970. His twenty-year reign making him the club's longest serving manager. He led the team to a host of regional cup finals, as well as taking them into the rounds proper of the FA Cup on eleven occasions, but was not able to bring them any significant success in the league.

After leaving Margate he had a spell as a scout for Luton Town.

References

1912 births
1994 deaths
People from Hove
Tottenham Hotspur F.C. players
West Ham United F.C. players
Southend United F.C. players
Bradford City A.F.C. players
Margate F.C. players
Margate F.C. managers
English footballers
Association football forwards
English football managers
Southwick F.C. players
West Ham United F.C. wartime guest players
Brighton & Hove Albion F.C. players
Association football scouts
Luton Town F.C. non-playing staff